In the United States, there has long been competition and racial prejudice between African Americans and Latino Americans. There have also been inter-racial tensions between African Americans and Asian Americans.

U.S public policy 
Current US policy advocates a multiculturalist discourse to acknowledge multiracial difference.  Multiculturalist theorists such as Claire Jean Kim criticize this contemporary policy because it refuses to acknowledge the interminority inequalities and antagonisms generated by changing demographics.

African American-Latino relations 
With the growth of the Latino American in the United States, there are areas of competition for housing, jobs and other resources with African Americans. Tensions in communities have also been reflected in racial tensions between these ethnic groups in prisons.  In several significant riots in California prisons, for instance, Latino and black inmates targeted each other over racial issues. There have been reports of racially motivated attacks by gangs against African Americans who have moved into neighborhoods occupied mostly by Hispanic Americans, and vice versa.

African American–Jewish relations 

Jewish Americans were the targets of 11.7 percent of hate crimes (835 out of 7,120) in that period, while  Muslim Americans were the targets of 188 out of 7,120 hate crimes in that time.

Tensions between African Americans and Asian Americans 
Despite African Americans and Asian Americans each having suffered from racial prejudice in the United States, some of their people have uneasy relations with the other ethnic group. Because of the centuries of abuses from historic slavery and its aftermath, discussions of racial tension in the United States have often focused on black-white relations. This has failed to include the perspective of Asian Americans in the racial discourse. Some Asian Americans feel stuck in limbo, as they have had differences and suffered discrimination from each of these other ethnic groups. At the same time, Asian Americans have been extolled as the “model minority”, because of their record of achievement and statistically high reported educational scores and incomes. But not all are equally successful. While these two groups have both faced historical and current racial discrimination from whites, the forms of discrimination have taken diverse forms. In addition, these two groups (which encompass numerous ancestral backgrounds) have also competed for jobs, education and resources over the decades, and have displayed tensions toward each other.

History 
Under the United States’ Naturalization Act of 1790, only “free white person(s)” were eligible to be naturalized as American citizens with the full rights that accompany them. While the intention at the time was to avoid granting enslaved African Americans and free blacks the same privileges as European American colonists, future waves of immigrants and ethnicities from different areas, such as those from Asia and Africa, without full naturalization.

Before the 1870 Census, ethnic Asians and Asian Americans were classified as “white” in the official census. They began to be called “model minorities” because they established a societal reputation for "hard work". But in the West, which had such a high rate of Asian immigrants that there was white resistance to their presence, the majority passed laws and courts ruled against allowing  them the same rights as European Americans. For instance, in the California court case, People v. Hall,  "the court found that people of Asian descent could not testify under existing legal acts that prohibited testimony from people of African descent. According to the California Supreme Court in 1854, the court ruled“ [T]he words ‘Black person’...must be taken as contradistinguished from White, and necessarily excludes all races other than the Caucasian”. As the 19th century progressed, white resistance resulted in Acts of Congress such as the Chinese Exclusion Act of 1882 and the Geary Act of 1892, which effectively barred further immigration of Asians until the 20th century.

While their numbers were few in the South, Chinese immigrants were recruited as laborers by planters in the early 20th century. They worked to get out of the fields, establishing small community groceries and similar businesses. They also worked to distinguish themselves from the restrictions of racial segregation that African Americans were forced to endure. In 1927 a Chinese family in Mississippi brought suit challenging its daughters' expulsion from a local school for white students. In the binary system of the time, the school system had classified the girls as non-white and therefore prohibited. The state Supreme Court upheld the local decision. It ruled that state law defined whites as specifically Caucasian and said that if the girls attended public school, they would have to go to one for "black" students, as all other ethnicities than white were classified (including Native Americans). Their parents knew that these schools were poorly funded and lower in quality than those provided to white students. In Lum v. Rice, the U.S. Supreme Court unanimously affirmed that decision, holding that it was not a violation of the Fourteenth Amendment for states to classify students by race and segregate them on that basis. the early 20th century Asian nationals, such as Japanese immigrants, were prohibited from owning land or businesses in some states. If their American-born children were old enough, property was put in their name.

The rate of Asian immigration and naturalization increased following the Immigration and Naturalization Law of 1952, which repealed previous limits to Asian immigration. This allowed for the de jure'' protection of Asian immigration into the United States. But it did not protect such immigrants and their descendants from the varieties of de facto prejudice, bullying, hate crimes, and segregation faced by ethnic minorities. Certain European American immigrants also faced such discrimination.

As Asian Americans established their niches in society, they faced discrimination from white Americans who treated them like they did African Americans at the time. With members of organizations like the Ku Klux Klan intimidating, assaulting, bullying, and attacking Asian Americans (particularly Chinese Americans), the arrival of the Civil Rights Movement and its successive laws helped codify the rights and protections of ethnic minorities. Despite facing similar attacks on their cultures and people, Asian Americans and African Americans found themselves divided and clashing within the 20th century.

Asian Americans' role as explained by the middleman theory 
This tension and divide can be best explained not as an analysis of two ethnic groups, but as an analysis of the role ethnic minorities have played as a whole within American society. As more ethnic groups began entering the civil discourse in the United States, main media and social figures began painting these groups as subdivisions of the white-black divide. Western American society views Asian Americans’ successes as lumped together with European Americans. This is often used as a comparison to the economic struggles of African Americans, who feel that it negates their struggles. Comparatively, they are seen socially as part of the same minority culture as other ethnic groups compared to “white” culture. The divisions are even more pronounced through what has been identified as “middle man theory".

This idea has been used to describe the relationship that Asian Americans often play between European Americans and African Americans. It suggests that one group acts as a linking partner to other groups, where these groups are typically divided by class or race. In terms of the Asian American-African American relationship, Asian Americans have played the role of middlemen between African Americans and European Americans. Particularly among early generations of immigrants and their children, they established niches as shopkeepers and merchants.

Within this relationship, Asian Americans are seen to be profiting from both ethnic groups, which can fuel the stereotype of the “model minority” from European Americans, as well as a distrust from and of African Americans. From this viewpoint, Asian Americans from their societal privileges can be viewed as being the same as European Americans by African Americans in terms of having a larger median income as well as receiving on average lighter punishments from the American judicial system. Meanwhile, a significant percentage of Asian Americans share a view with European Americans that African Americans “aren't capable of getting ahead”, according to a study conducted by the National Conference of Christians and Jews. This sentiment flared especially during the era of racial tension in Los Angeles surrounding the Rodney King case.

Rodney King riots 
Los Angeles leading up to 1992 had a large number of Korean Americans. As people migrated from Korea during and after the Korean War, many moved to settle in Los Angeles, but could not work in the same traditionally white collar jobs they held back home. Instead, many opened up businesses in areas where the rent was cheap in predominantly African American communities. Korean American and African American community leaders soon realized that tension existed predominantly due to differences in culture as well as a language barrier. This came to a head during the era of the riots as Korean grocer Soon Ja Du shot and killed a black teenage girl in her store, and received a remarkably milder sentence compared to other sentences given by judges at the time to African Americans in the judicial system.

Relations worsened during the Rodney King Riots, as riots and protests hit 2,200 Korean small businesses. African Americans felt cheated by the judicial system, as they had faced much more stringent punishments for charges involving an armed weapon, while Korean Americans felt targeted and attacked by the African American community for having their businesses destroyed. This led to Korean Americans being divided by those who felt abandoned and betrayed by the police and those who felt threatened by African Americans in their community.

Violent hate crimes and racist bullying

Various ethnic groups in the United States have perpetrated racist violence against Asian Americans, which were commonly caused by both White Americans and African Americans respectively. The 2019 Bureau of Justice Statistics figures indicated that 27.5 percent of those committing violence were Black; 24.1 percent were white; 21.4 percent were Hispanic or "other" and well under 15 percent were Asian.

Prominent murders of Asian Americans by African Americans
Murders of Ming Qu and Ying Wu
Murder of Ki-Suck Han
Murder of Wai Kuen Kwok
Killing of Ee Lee
Killing of Yao Pan Ma
Killing of Vicha Ratanapakdee
Killing of Christina Yuna Lee
Death of Michelle Go
Death of GuiYing Ma
Death of Zinat Hossain

Examples 
1992 Los Angeles Riots
Crown Heights Riot
New York City draft riots
George Floyd protests

See also 

 African American–Jewish relations
 Gangs in the United States are often a vehicle for inter-ethnic conflict
 Race and crime in the United States
 Homophobia in ethnic minority communities
 Racism in the United States

References 

African–Hispanic and Latino American relations
African-American–Asian-American relations
Minorities
Multiracial affairs in the United States
Racism in the United States
Social history of the United States
Harassment
Persecution